Franklin Pangborn (January 23, 1889 – July 20, 1958) was an American comedic character actor famous for playing small but memorable roles with comic flair. He appeared in many Preston Sturges movies as well as the W. C. Fields films International House, The Bank Dick, and Never Give a Sucker an Even Break. For his contributions to motion pictures, he received a star on the Hollywood Walk of Fame at 1500 Vine Street posthumously on February 8, 1960.

Early years
Pangborn was born in Newark, New Jersey. During World War I, he served for 14 months with the 312th Infantry in Europe.

Career
An encounter with actress Mildred Holland when he was 17 led to Pangborn's first professional acting experience. He was working for an insurance company when she learned about his ambitions for acting and offered him an extra's position with her company at $12 per week, initially during his two weeks' vacation. That opportunity grew into four years' touring with Holland and her troupe. Following that, he acted in Jessie Bonstelle's stock company.

In the early 1930s, Pangborn worked in short subjects for Mack Sennett, Hal Roach, Universal Pictures, Columbia Pictures, and Pathé Exchange, almost always in support of the leading players. (For example, he played a befuddled photographer opposite "Spanky" McFarland in the Our Gang short subject Wild Poses.) He also appeared in scores of feature films in small roles, cameos, and recurring gags.

Pangborn played essentially the same character: prissy, polite, elegant, highly energetic, often officious, fastidious, somewhat nervous, prone to becoming flustered but essentially upbeat, and with immediately recognizable high-speed, patter-type speech. He typically played an officious desk clerk in a hotel, a self-important musician, a fastidious headwaiter, or an enthusiastic birdwatcher, and was usually put in a situation where he was frustrated or flustered by the antics of other characters.

Many years after Pangborn's death, LGBTQ historians claimed some of the characters he had portrayed onscreen had been gay stereotypes. Throughout his long career, such a topic was too sensitive to be discussed overtly by screenwriters, directors, studio executives or the newspaper columnists and critics who publicized movies.  In 1933, before the Hays Office began censoring films, International House included a rare instance of a screenwriter and director briefly alluding to homosexuality in a scene that included Pangborn’s character. A character known as Professor Quail, portrayed by W.C. Fields, has just landed his autogyro on the roof of the titular hotel in the Chinese city of Wuhu, but he does not know where he is. He has the following exchange with the hotel manager, portrayed by Pangborn:

 
 Professor Quail: Hey! Where am I?
 Woman: Wu-Hu.
 Professor Quail: Woo-Hoo to you sweetheart! Hey Charlie! Where am I?
 Pangborn: WU-HU!
 (Fields then removes the flower from his lapel) 
 Professor Quail: Don't let the posy fool ya!

Pangborn was an effective foil for many major comedians, including Fields, Harold Lloyd, Olsen and Johnson, and The Ritz Brothers. He appeared regularly in comedies, including several directed by Preston Sturges, and in some musicals of the 1940s. When movie roles became scarce, he worked in television, including The Red Skelton Show (in which he played a comical murderous bandit) and a This Is Your Life tribute to Mack Sennett, his old boss. Pangborn was briefly the announcer on Jack Paar's The Tonight Show in 1957, but was fired after the first few weeks for a lack of "spontaneous enthusiasm" and replaced by Hugh Downs. 

Pangborn's final public performance came as a supporting player in The Red Skelton Show episode for April 22, 1958.

Selected filmography
All feature films are listed below. Many short films, however, are missing.

The Jelly Fish (1926, Short) - Clarence, the Jelly Fish
Exit Smiling (1926) - Cecil Lovelace (feature film debut)
Finger Prints (1927) - The Bandoline Kid
Getting Gertie's Garter (1927) - Algy Brooks
High Hat (1927) - Minor Role
 The Night Bride (1927) - John Stockton
Cradle Snatchers (1927) - Howard Drake
The Rejuvenation of Aunt Mary (1927) - Melville
The Girl in the Pullman (1927) - Hector Brooks
My Friend from India (1927) - William / Tommy Valentine
A Blonde for a Night (1928) - Hector
On Trial (1928) - Turnbull
The Rush Hour (1928) - Troublemaker at Bohemia Cafe (uncredited)
Lady of the Pavements (1929) - M'sieu Dubrey, Dance Master
The Sap (1929) - Ed Mason
Not So Dumb (1930) - Leach
Cheer Up and Smile (1930) - Professor
Her Man (1930) - Sport
A Lady Surrenders (1930) - Lawton
Sunny (1930) - Party Guest (uncredited)
A Woman of Experience (1931) - Hans, a Sailor
Over the Counter (1932, Short) Department Store Employee
Stepping Sisters (1932) - Gason
A Fool's Advice (1932) - Egbert, Hotel Clerk
Midnight Patrol (1932)
The Loud Mouth (1932, Short) - Freddie Quimby
The Half-Naked Truth (1932) - Mr. Wellburton, Hotel Clerk
Parachute Jumper (1933) - Man in Private Office (uncredited)
Sweepings (1933) - Photographer (uncredited)
Sing, Bing, Sing (1933, Short) - Herbert
International House (1933) - Hotel Manager
Professional Sweetheart (1933) - Herbert Childress
Bed of Roses (1933) - Floorwalker
The Important Witness (1933) - Groom
Headline Shooter (1933) - Adolphus G. Crocker
Menu (1933, Short) - John Xavier Omsk (uncredited)
Wild Poses (1933, Little Rascals short) - Otto Phocus, the Portrait Photographer
Only Yesterday (1933) - Tom (uncredited)
Design for Living (1933) - Mr. Douglas, Theatrical Producer
Flying Down to Rio (1933) - Hammerstein, the Hotel Manager (uncredited)
 Unknown Blonde (1934) - Male Co-Respondent
Manhattan Love Song (1934) - Garrett Wetherby
Strictly Dynamite (1934) - Mr. Bailey
Many Happy Returns (1934) - Allen's Secretary
Cockeyed Cavaliers (1934) - Town Crier (uncredited)
King Kelly of the U.S.A. (1934) - J. Ashton Brockton
Young and Beautiful (1934) - Radio Announcer
That's Gratitude (1934) - Photographer
Tomorrow's Youth (1934) - Thornton, the Tutor
Imitation of Life (1934) - Mr. Carven (uncredited)
 Flirtation (1934) - Veterinarian
College Rhythm (1934) - Peabody
 Eight Bells (1935) - Finch
The Headline Woman (1935) - Hamilton
She Married Her Boss (1935) - Window Dresser (uncredited)
She Couldn't Take It (1935) - Spot's Secretary (uncredited)
1,000 Dollars a Minute (1935) - Reville
Tango (1936) - Oscar the Photographer
Don't Gamble with Love (1936) - Salesman
Give Us This Night (1936) - Forcellini's Secretary
Doughnuts and Society (1936) - Benson
Mr. Deeds Goes to Town (1936) - the Tailor (uncredited)
To Mary - with Love (1936) - Guest
My Man Godfrey (1936) - Guthrie (uncredited)
Swing Banditry (1936, short) - Radio Station Employee (uncredited)
In His Steps (1936) - (uncredited)
The Luckiest Girl in the World (1936) - Cashier
Hats Off (1936) - Mr. Churchill
Three Smart Girls (1936) - Jeweler (uncredited)
The Mandarin Mystery (1936) - Mellish
High Hat (1937) - Renaldo Breton
Dangerous Number (1937) - Hotel Desk Clerk (uncredited)
She's Dangerous (1937) - Renaud
Rich Relations (1937) - Mr. Dwight
They Wanted to Marry (1937) - Hotel Manager (uncredited)
Swing High, Swing Low (1937) - Henri
When Love Is Young (1937) - John Dorman
We Have Our Moments (1937) - Joe the Bartender (uncredited)
Step Lively, Jeeves! (1937) - Gaston
A Star Is Born (1937) - Billy Moon (uncredited)
Turn Off the Moon (1937) - Mr. Perkins
Hotel Haywire (1937) - Fuller Brush Salesman (uncredited)
Dangerous Holiday (1937) - Doffle
She Had to Eat (1937) - Mr. Phoecian-Wylie
Easy Living (1937) - Van Buren
The Lady Escapes (1937) - Pierre
It's All Yours (1937) - Schultz
The Life of the Party (1937) - Beggs
It Happened in Hollywood (1937) - Mr. Forsythe
All Over Town (1937) - the Costumer
Stage Door (1937) - Harcourt
Living on Love (1937) - Ogilvie O. Oglethorpe
I'll Take Romance (1937) - Kane's Secretary (uncredited)
She Married an Artist (1937) - Paul
Thrill of a Lifetime (1937) - Sam Williams
Love on Toast (1937) - Finley
Mad About Music (1938) - Hotel Manager (uncredited)
Rebecca of Sunnybrook Farm (1938) - Hamilton Montmarcy
Bluebeard's Eighth Wife (1938) - Assistant Hotel Manager
Joy of Living (1938) - Orchestra Leader
Doctor Rhythm (1938) - Mr. Stenchfield (Store Clerk)
Vivacious Lady (1938) - Apartment Manager
Three Blind Mice (1938) - Clerk
Always Goodbye (1938) - Bicycle Salesman
Four's a Crowd (1938) - Preston
Carefree (1938) - Roland Hunter
Just Around the Corner (1938) - Waters
The Girl Downstairs (1938) - Adolf Pumpfel
Topper Takes a Trip (1938) - Hotel Manager
Broadway Serenade (1939) - Gene
5th Ave Girl (1939) - Higgins
Turnabout (1940) - Mr. Pingboom
Public Deb No. 1 (1940) - Bartender
Spring Parade (1940) - Wiedlemeyer
The Villain Still Pursued Her (1940) - Bartender (uncredited)
Hit Parade of 1941 (1940) - Carter
Christmas in July (1940) - Don Hartman, Radio Announcer
The Bank Dick (1940) - J. Pinkerton Snoopington
Where Did You Get That Girl? (1941) - Digby
A Girl, a Guy and a Gob (1941) - Pet Shop Owner
The Flame of New Orleans (1941) - Bellows
Bachelor Daddy (1941) - Williams, Club Manager
Tillie the Toiler (1941) - Perry Tweedale
Never Give a Sucker an Even Break (1941) - The Producer
Weekend for Three (1941) - Number Seven
Sullivan's Travels (1941) - Mr. Casalsis
Mr. District Attorney in the Carter Case (1941) - Charley Towne
Call Out the Marines (1942) - Wilbur
Obliging Young Lady (1942) - Prof. Gibney
What's Cookin'? (1942) - Professor Bistell
Moonlight Masquerade (1942) - Fairchild
The Palm Beach Story (1942) - Manager
Now, Voyager (1942) - Mr. Thompson
George Washington Slept Here (1942) - Mr. Gibney
Strictly in the Groove (1942) - Cathcart
Reveille with Beverly (1943) - Vernon Lewis
Two Weeks to Live (1943) - Mr. Pinkney
Stage Door Canteen (1943) - Franklin Pangborn
Honeymoon Lodge (1943) - Cathcart
Holy Matrimony (1943) - Duncan Farll
Crazy House (1943) - Hotel Clerk
Never a Dull Moment (1943) - Sylvester
My Best Gal (1944) - Mr. Porter
The Great Moment (1944) - Dr. Heywood
Allergic to Love (1944) - Stewart Ives III
Hail the Conquering Hero (1944) - Reception Committee Chairman
Reckless Age (1944) - Mr. Thurtle
See My Lawyer (1945) - B.J. Wagonhorn
The Horn Blows at Midnight (1945) - Radio Engineer / Sloan, House Detective
Hollywood and Vine (1945) - Reggie Allen
You Came Along (1945) - Hotel Clerk
Tell It to a Star (1945) - Horace Lovelace
The Sailor Takes a Wife (1945) - Salesman (uncredited)
Lover Come Back (1946) - Hotel Clerk
Two Guys from Milwaukee (1946) - Theatre Manager
Calendar Girl (1947) - 'Dilly' Dillingsworth
I'll Be Yours (1947) - Barber
The Sin of Harold Diddlebock (1947) - Formfit Franklin
Romance on the High Seas (1948) - Rio Hotel Clerk
My Dream Is Yours (1949) - Sourpuss Manager
Addio Mimí! (1949) - The Cat Lover
Down Memory Lane (1949) - Mr. Sennett's Representative / Gilbert Sinclair
Oh, Men! Oh, Women! (1957) - Steamship Clerk (uncredited)
The Story of Mankind (1957) - Marquis de Varennes

References

Further reading

External links

1889 births
1958 deaths
20th-century American male actors
American male film actors
American male television actors
American male stage actors
American gay actors
Male actors from Newark, New Jersey
Deaths from cancer in California
Burials at Forest Lawn Memorial Park (Glendale)
LGBT people from New Jersey
RKO Pictures contract players